Reshape Reason (stylized as Reshape | Reason) is the debut album by progressive metal band Elitist.

Track listing

2012 debut albums
Elitist (band) albums